The 1st constituency of the Seine-Maritime (French: Première circonscription de la Seine-Maritime) is a French legislative constituency in the Seine-Maritime département. Like the other 576 French constituencies, it elects one MP using the two-round system, with a run-off if no candidate receives over 50% of the vote in the first round.

Description
The 1st Constituency of the Seine-Maritime covers the historic city of Rouen. The seat was expanded as a result of the 2010 redistricting of French legislative constituencies to include Mont-Saint-Aignan, a northern suburb of the city. Mont-Saint-Aignan is noted for its large student population as a result of being home to both the University of Rouen and the NEOMA Business School.

After 19 years of centre right representation the seat swung back to the Socialist Party in 2012 before then falling to the centrist En Marche! in 2017.

Assembly Members

Election results

2022

 
 
 
 
 
 
 
 
|-
| colspan="8" bgcolor="#E9E9E9"|
|-
 
 

 
 
 
 
 

* PS dissident, not endorsed by NUPES alliance.

2017

 
 
 
 
 
 
|-
| colspan="8" bgcolor="#E9E9E9"|
|-

2012

 
 
 
 
 
 
|-
| colspan="8" bgcolor="#E9E9E9"|
|-

2007

 
 
 
 
 
 
 
|-
| colspan="8" bgcolor="#E9E9E9"|
|-

2002

 
 
 
 
 
 
|-
| colspan="8" bgcolor="#E9E9E9"|
|-

1997

 
 
 
 
 
 
 
 
 
|-
| colspan="8" bgcolor="#E9E9E9"|
|-

References

1